Falsimargarita terespira is a species of sea snail, a marine gastropod mollusc in the family Calliostomatidae.

Description
The height of the shell attains 14 mm.

Distribution
This species occurs in the Atlantic Ocean off Southern Brazil.

References

 Simone L.R.L. (2008) A new species of Falsimargarita (Vetigastropoda, Trochidae) from southern Brazil. Strombus 15(1): 15–18.

External links
 

terespira
Gastropods described in 2008
Molluscs of the Atlantic Ocean